Dharsiwa is one of the 90 Legislative Assembly constituencies of Chhattisgarh state in India. The seat has formed after the demolition of Raipur Town Vidhansabha Constituency in 2008. It is in Raipur district.

Anita Yogendra Sharma of Indian National Congress was elected as the Member of the Legislative Assembly (India) from this seat in the 2018 Assembly elections in the State. It forms a part of the Lok Sabha constituency of Raipur.

Members of the Legislative Assembly

Election results

2018

See also
List of constituencies of the Chhattisgarh Legislative Assembly
Raipur district

References

Raipur district
Assembly constituencies of Chhattisgarh